The 2016 Clipsal 500 Adelaide was a motor racing event for V8 Supercars, held on the weekend of 4 to 6 March 2016. The event was held at the Adelaide Street Circuit in Adelaide, South Australia, and consisted of two races of 125 kilometres and one race of 155 km in length. It was the first event of fourteen in the 2016 International V8 Supercars Championship and hosted Races 1, 2 and 3 of the season. The event was the 18th running of the Adelaide 500.

The three races were won by Jamie Whincup, James Courtney and Nick Percat respectively. Percat's win was the first for Lucas Dumbrell Motorsport and came in the midst of controversy surrounding pit stop regulations. The third race was also affected by adverse weather conditions, which caused the race to be red flagged, and eventually finished 30 laps short of the scheduled length. Michael Caruso, despite not winning a race, left the event with the championship lead.

Report

Background
The event saw two drivers make their full-time driving debut in the series: Cameron Waters, the winner of the 2015 V8 Supercars Dunlop Series, competed for Prodrive Racing Australia, replacing Chaz Mostert who was moved into the customer Rod Nash Racing car; and Aaren Russell, another former Dunlop Series driver, who drove for Erebus Motorsport. The event was Mostert's first since the 2015 Supercheap Auto Bathurst 1000, where injuries sustained in a major crash in qualifying forced him to miss the final four events of 2015. Nick Percat also returned from injury, having missed the final two events of 2015 with a foot infection.

Erebus Motorsport replaced their Mercedes-Benz E63 AMGs with a pair of Holden VF Commodores, reducing the number of manufacturers in the field from five to four. The field itself expanded to 26 cars, up from 25 in 2015, following Triple Eight Race Engineering's purchase of a Racing Entitlements Contract from V8 Supercars management.

Practice
The first of three practice sessions was held on Friday morning and was 40 minutes in duration. Scott McLaughlin set the fastest lap time ahead of defending event winner James Courtney and 2015 series runner-up Craig Lowndes. The session was mostly trouble-free, with the only incidents seeing Tim Slade run down the escape road at Turn 4 and Jamie Whincup spin at Turn 9. A second 40-minute session was held on Friday afternoon, with McLaughlin again setting the fastest time. All drivers used the soft compound tyre in this session, with McLaughlin's time of 1:19.6977 being a new practice record. Triple Eight Race Engineering teammates Whincup and Shane van Gisbergen were second and third.

The final practice session was a 20-minute session held on Saturday morning. Michael Caruso was quickest ahead of James Courtney and David Reynolds, with teams focussing on race setup ahead of the two races in the afternoon.

Qualifying – Races 1 and 2
Two ten-minute qualifying sessions were held on Friday evening which set the grid for the two 125 km races on Saturday. Drivers were allowed to use only the soft tyre in the first session and only the hard tyre in the second. Scott Pye took his first career pole position in the first session ahead of Whincup and McLaughlin. Reigning champion Mark Winterbottom was fourth with Courtney in fifth. Russell was investigated for impeding Whincup at the final corner. Russell was going slowly, preparing to start a fast lap, while Whincup was at the end of a fast lap and lost time trying to avoid the rear of Russell's car. A similar situation led to a major accident involving Jonathon Webb and Greg Murphy at the 2012 Clipsal 500 Adelaide.

Mostert, after qualifying only 12th in the first session, set the fastest time in the second session to take pole position for the second race. Whincup and McLaughlin were again second and third, with Courtney and Van Gisbergen rounding out the top five. Pye was seventh fastest. Mostert was surprised at taking pole position on his return to the series, saying: "I’ll still be up the pointy end which is great ... I’m a bit lost for words, I can’t really describe it. It’s kind of like my first pole all over again."

Race 1
Race 1 took place on Saturday afternoon and required drivers to use soft tyres only. Whincup took the lead at the start with Pye assuming second position ahead of McLaughlin, Winterbottom, Courtney and Van Gisbergen. Lee Holdsworth was spun at Turn 6 on lap 1 and fell to the back of the field. Whincup built a lead of over five seconds in the opening laps, with Pye maintaining second place under pressure from McLaughlin. The first pit stops began taking place on lap 5, with Lowndes and Mostert coming in on this lap to take on fuel and have tyres changed. The safety car was called on lap 14 after Slade went down the escape road at Turn 9 and was unable to select reverse gear.

After all drivers had made their pit stop, Whincup continued to lead with Courtney moving up to second place ahead of Van Gisbergen and McLaughlin. Pye had fallen down the order after losing time in his pit stop, with the car being dropped from the jacks with the left-rear wheel not fastened properly. The resulting delay in jacking the car back up and tightening the wheel nut dropped him to twelfth place. The safety car returned to the pits on lap 18 and Whincup again built a gap over second place, leading all the way to the finish. Courtney finished second ahead of Van Gisbergen and McLaughlin, while Garth Tander was fifth after passing Winterbottom, Lowndes and Todd Kelly following the safety car period.

Race 2
Race 2 also took place on Saturday afternoon but was run on hard tyres. Percat was unable to start the race due to an electrical problem on the parade lap. Mostert led the opening laps from pole position with Courtney moving into second place after making a good start from fourth on the grid. The safety car was called on lap 2 when Chris Pither crashed at Turn 8. Racing resumed on lap 7 with Mostert leading Courtney, Whincup, McLaughlin and Van Gisbergen. Drivers began making their pit stops at the end of lap 9, with several drivers pitting at this time.

Mostert, Courtney, Whincup and McLaughlin maintained their positions after all drivers had completed their pit stops, while Van Gisbergen dropped back after a slow stop. Tander also endured a difficult pit stop, with the car stalling as he left the pit bay and not being able to be restarted for a number of laps. When Tander eventually rejoined the circuit, he was hit by Tim Blanchard at the Senna Chicane. Blanchard's car was damaged and the resulting repairs left him six laps off the lead. A second safety car period was needed to clean up debris from the incident. Courtney took the lead at Turn 9 on lap 21, with Whincup taking second as Mostert was pushed wide on the exit of the corner. Courtney and Whincup then battled to the end of the race, Courtney emerging as the winner by six tenths of a second. Mostert held on to complete the podium while McLaughlin was fourth ahead of a recovering Shane van Gisbergen.

Qualifying – Race 3
Qualifying for Race 3 consisted of a 20-minute qualifying session held on Sunday morning followed by a top ten shootout on Sunday afternoon. Only 25 cars took part in the session, with Pither's crash in Race 2 doing enough damage to rule the car out of Race 3. The qualifying session was stopped for several minutes when a power steering line on James Moffat's car broke and left power steering fluid on the track at the final corner which needed to be cleaned up. McLaughlin was fastest, setting a time of 1:20.4055 at the end of the session. McLaughlin, Mostert, Whincup, Van Gisbergen, Fabian Coulthard, Rick Kelly, Pye, Winterbottom, Courtney and Waters progressed to the top ten shootout as a result of being the fastest ten drivers.

The top ten shootout saw each of the ten drivers complete one flying lap each, in reverse order of their qualifying positions. Waters, in his first top ten shootout, was the first driver out and set a time of 1:22.6300. Courtney triggered the kerb sensor at Turn 2 on his lap, which led to his lap time being invalidated and leaving him tenth on the grid. Winterbottom beat Waters' time by a quarter of a second before Rick Kelly bettered Winterbottom's time by over half a second. Coulthard was the sixth driver to run and set a time of 1:21.3006, another half a second faster than Kelly, which would be fast enough to secure pole position. Of the remaining runners, Mostert got closest to Coulthard's time with 1:21.3071.

Race 3
Race 3 took place on Sunday afternoon and was scheduled to run for 78 laps, a distance of 250 km. A rain storm passed over the circuit just prior to the start of the race, prompting the majority of the drivers in the field to change from slick to wet weather tyres on the grid. Winterbottom, one of several drivers to remain on slick tyres, almost hit the wall at Turn 8 on the warm-up lap. Along with the other drivers on slick tyres, he pitted at the end of the warm-up lap to change to wet weather tyres. The race start was delayed, however, as Russell's car stopped on the warm-up lap and had to be collected. With the rain getting heavier, the race was started under the control of the safety car, which remained on the track for the first six laps to allow drivers to get a feel for the conditions. With the regulations requiring each car to take on 140 litres of fuel during the race, some drivers took advantage of the safety car period to fulfil part of the requirement. This caused controversy, as there was confusion as to whether or not the race had actually started, with some teams believing that the official start of the race would not occur until the safety car returned to the pit lane. V8 Supercar regulations state that a race may be started under the safety car in extreme circumstances, such as poor weather, and that the official start of the race is when the safety car returns to the pit lane. However, this is only the case when the warm-up lap has not been completed. As it had been completed in this case, the race was deemed to have started when the safety car led the field away from the grid.

The safety car returned to the pits on lap 7, with Coulthard in the lead ahead of Mostert and Van Gisbergen. Whincup was spun by Tander, while Van Gisbergen took the lead from Coulthard before running wide at Turn 9 and handing the lead back. At the same time, Rick Kelly was spun by Mostert. Van Gisbergen regained the lead a couple of laps later, with Courtney following him through into second place. Van Gisbergen then ran wide at Turn 4, giving the lead to Courtney. The two made contact at Turn 9, allowing Lowndes through to the lead. With the rain stopped and the track drying out, drivers began to pit to change back to slick tyres, led by Jason Bright on lap 18. Lowndes continued to lead ahead of Courtney and Mostert. Mostert hit the wall at Turn 8 on lap 28, spinning into the escape road at Turn 9 and retiring from the race. On the same lap, drivers started to change back to wet tyres as rain had started falling again.

Courtney led until lap 36, when he aquaplaned going into Turn 8 and hit the wall, damaging the car and forcing him to return to the pits for repairs. The safety car was deployed due to the worsening conditions, with McLaughlin leading Davison and Lowndes. As the conditions continued to deteriorate, and a marshal was affected by lightning, the race was suspended on lap 42, with all cars returning to the pit lane. With the majority of the field having not taken on the required 140 L of fuel, questions were raised on how this would affect the result if the race was not restarted. The rules stated that any car that had not fulfilled the fuel requirement would be given a time penalty following the race, but it was unclear as to whether or not this applied to a shortened race. The race restarted at 5:10 pm with five minutes of its allocated time remaining, and drivers who had not met the fuel requirement, with the exception of Coulthard and Pye, pitted to take on the remaining fuel. This left Percat to take victory, his first solo win in the series, having completed 48 laps, ahead of Coulthard, Pye, Caruso and Tander. However, Coulthard and Pye were immediately given a 30-second time penalty for not complying with the fuel regulations, dropping them to 14th and 15th places respectively.

The result left Caruso with the championship lead, 20 points ahead of Tander. Whincup was third, with Van Gisbergen and McLaughin completing the top five.

Post-race
The time penalties for Coulthard and Pye were extended to 60 seconds following the race, dropping them to 16th and 17th. The same penalty was also applied to Courtney, Slade and Moffat, but this did not affect the final result. Pye was disappointed by the situation, saying: "It was physically impossible for us to fit it in because of the amount we chose to start with. That race, I don’t know how you can count it. It was a non-event." Holden Racing Team team principal Adrian Burgess questioned the application of the minimum fuel drop rule in a rain-affected race, saying: "Do we really need the fuel drop when we have a race like that? We probably don’t. Just let the guys up the front race hard in wet conditions."

Drivers described the race as one of the most chaotic they had ever competed in, with Lowndes describing the race as "bizarre" and McLaughlin saying: "It was the craziest race I’ve ever been a part of." Percat thanked his team Lucas Dumbrell Motorsport for the win, which was the team's first, saying: "This is an unbelievable moment in my career." Tander and Mostert were both penalised 15 championship points for causing incidents in the race. Along with the increased penalties for Pye and Coulthard, this dropped Tander to fifth place in the championship, with Whincup moving into second, 15 points behind Caruso.

Following the controversy over the start of the race, V8 Supercars decided to review race start procedures.

Results

Race 1

Qualifying

Race

Race 2

Qualifying

Race

Race 3

Qualifying

Top Ten Shootout

Race

Championship standings after the event
 After Race 3 of 29. Only the top five positions are included for both sets of standings.

Drivers' Championship standings

Teams' Championship standings

Notes

References

Adelaide 500
Clipsal 500
Clipsal 500 Adelaide
2010s in Adelaide